"Mistakes" is a song written by Richard Feldman, and recorded by American country music artist Don Williams.  It was released in August 1982 as the second single from the album Listen to the Radio.  The song reached number 3 on the Billboard Hot Country Singles & Tracks chart

Chart performance

References

1982 singles
1982 songs
Don Williams songs
Song recordings produced by Garth Fundis
MCA Records singles
Songs written by Richard Feldman (songwriter)